Christy C. Karacas (born March 8, 1975) is an American musician, animator, voice actor, director and writer, known for creating Superjail! and Ballmastrz: 9009 for Adult Swim and directing the Cartoon Network series Robotomy.

Life and career
As a child, Karacas frequently drew, with inspiration from comic book superheroes and Star Wars characters to Family Feud scenarios, often with violent themes (though Karacas has explained that he in actuality is "a very non-confrontational person"). Karacas went on to study film and animation at the Rhode Island School of Design, though he wanted to originally get into live action material. For his senior film project, Karacas created the student film Space War, which raised his profile via showings at animation festivals.

Karacas began his career in the animation industry at MTV Animation, where he served as a background designer for Daria. He is a founding member and guitar player for the band Cheeseburger, and he also worked with title sequences, animation, and illustration for VBS.tv and Vice magazine. While working on Daria, around 2001, Karacas and friend Stephen Warbrick created the short film Barfight and presented it for showing at numerous film festivals, though it was rejected at all of them. Dispirited, Karacas spent time working on his band. Several years later, Barfight caught the attention of Adult Swim, who allowed them and Ben Gruber to create a show of their own called Superjail!.

Superjail! was originally animated by Augenblick Studios in the pilot episode and first season, but was later animated by Titmouse, Inc. from seasons two to four. However, the series ended its run in 2014. While working on Superjail!, Karacas worked on several other projects, including directing the short-lived Cartoon Network animated series Robotomy, which ran from 2010 to 2011, and writing new material with his bandmates of Cheeseburger.

After Superjail!, Karacas moved on to create another show for Adult Swim, titled Ballmastrz: 9009, which premiered in 2018. The show was renewed for a second season, which began airing February 23, 2020.

Influences
Karacas' influences include Tex Avery, child art, Bob Clampett, John Kricfalusi, Vince Collins, Sally Cruikshank, Nick Cross, Fleischer Studios, Hanna-Barbera, Chuck Jones, Tom Ruegger, The Simpsons, The Itchy & Scratchy Show, Looney Tunes, Mad, Jay Ward, Monty Python, Joe Murray, Klasky Csupo, Walt Disney, Robert Crumb, Mike Diana, Ralph Bakshi, Sesame Street, The Muppets, Yellow Submarine, outsider art, Gary Panter, Pee-wee's Playhouse, Schoolhouse Rock!, Beavis and Butt-Head, Earthworm Jim, Dr. Seuss, The Three Stooges, anime, and underground comix.

Filmography
Karacas is notable for the following:

Space War (1997)
Daria (1997-2002) - Background designer
Life (1999) - Animator
Bar Fight (2006)
Squidbillies (2017) - Storyboard artist
Superjail! (2007; 2008–2014) - Co-creator, writer, executive producer, storyboard artist, director, voice actor, character layout artist, assistant animator, animator
Robotomy (2010-2011) - Co-executive producer, creative director, director
Out of the Black (2013) - Animator, co-director
Moonbeam City (2015)
Nerdland (2016) - Sequence animator: Video XV
Ballmastrz: 9009 (2018–present)
Ballmastrz: Rubicon (2023)

References

External links
 

American animators
American male musicians
American television writers
American male television writers
American male voice actors
Artists from New Hampshire
1975 births
American storyboard artists
Showrunners
Living people
Creative directors
Rhode Island School of Design alumni